The Tunisian diaspora refers to people of Tunisian origin living outside that country. It is the direct result of the strong rate of emigration which Tunisia has experienced since its independence in 1956. In the 1960s and 70s, the favourable economic situation in France and Europe increased the phenomenon. The beginning of the 1980s saw the clear development of a Tunisian community in Europe as a result of the large number of people.

Population 
In 2014 the number of Tunisians residing abroad was numbered at 1,282,371 individuals, of which 87% were living in Europe. However, this official figure appears to be lower than reality because of the inadequate recording of migration statistics. Thus it is not rare to discover a single data point represents all the members of a family or to discover duplicates. Among the citizens which are underrepresented in the statistics are the third generation in France (according to one estimate, only one in ten of these have been recorded) and the children of mixed-race parents. The illegal immigrants (very numerous in Italy for example) are by definition not included in the official statistics.

750000 have settled in France - one of the most important foreign communities in the country - and two thirds of them hold double citizenship. They are concentrated mostly in the large cities (40% in Paris, 12% in Lyons and 8% in Marseilles, with smaller communities in Nice, Bordeaux, Toulouse, Strasbourg, and Lille). Sonia Mabrouk connects this clumping phenomenon with the urban origin of the Tunisian migrants (Tunis and the littoral), but also with the nature of the different waves of migration. Thus the 1970s mainly saw the arrival of migrants from the south of Tunisia. These settled in the Rhône Valley and at Paris which offered the greatest number of opportunities for employment and created connections with their places of origin, which subsequently encouraged other migrants to settle in the same places. According to INSEE, 1.4% of children born in 2011 in Metropolitan France (i.e. 11,466 of 792,996) had a father born in Tunisia, with the greatest proportion in the departments of Alpes-Maritimes (8.6%), Var (4.5%), Seine-Saint-Denis (3.9%), Rhône (3.7%), Val-de-Marne (3.4%), and Bouches-du-Rhône (2.4%).

There are 110,385 Tunisians in the other Arab countries, 44,195 in North America, 3359 in Subsaharan Africa and 2365 in Asia (excepting the Arab countries); 514 Tunisians are accounted for in Australia.

Demographics 

Statistics of the Office of Tunisians Abroad show more than 128,000 Tunisian families in Europe with a concentration in France and Germany. Young Tunisians (less than 16 years of age) represent 25% of the Tunisian community abroad. Thus there is currently a rejuvenation of the Tunisian diaspora which is now in its third generation. Women represent nearly 26% of the total community. In France, their percentage is estimated at 38.2%. The portion of the diaspora who are over 60 years old is around 7%.

Originally, the largest part of the Tunisians in Europe worked in sectors requiring minimal qualifications. In effect the migrants of the 1960s and 70s were less educated (mostly farmers or manual labourers).

Subsequently, the majority of Tunisians settled in France have worked in the service sector (hotels, restaurants or retail) or have headed small businesses. In 2008, Tunisia became the first of the Maghreb countries to sign a management agreement concerning the flow of migrants, at the impetus of President Nicolas Sarkozy: it provides easy access for almost 9,000 Tunisian students enrolled in French institutions,  but also almost 500 titres de séjour (residency permits) for highly qualified individuals so that they can acquire experience in France, valid for a maximum of six years. In the Arab World the Tunisian population is mostly made up of very highly qualified individuals while labourers and other unskilled individuals form the majority in Asian countries like India, Pakistan, and Afghanistan.

Economic impact 
The contribution of Tunisians abroad encapsulates the projects which they support directly or indirectly in Tunisia. According to the Office of Tunisians Abroad, there were more than 8,845 such projects between 1987 and 2004, for a total investment of around 321 million dinar, generating 39,381 jobs, principally in services (64%) and industry (26%):
 5,649 projects related to services mobilised 140.1 million dinars and generated 17,397 jobs;
 2,423 projects in the industrial sector with 133.7 million in investment and 20,513 employed;
 773 projects in the agricultural sector for 47.2 million dinars of investment and 1,471 employed.

According to the Office of Tunisians Abroad, the Tunisians abroad make average of 1.1 billion dinars worth of transfers every year, 76% in the form of money transfers, which constitutes the fourth largest source of currency for the country, representing 5% of the GDP and 23% of national savings. But, although these transfers increase by 8.9% per year, the importance of this source of income has been decreasing continuously since 1996 and the number of projects created by Tunisians abroad has seemed to stagnate.

Notable persons of Tunisian descent
Ghali (Italy), Claudia Cardinale (Italy), Salah Mejri (United States), Max Azria (United States), M. Salah Baouendi (United States), Mustapha Tlili (United States), Ferrid Kheder (United States), Mounir Laroussi (United States),
Oussama Mellouli (United States), Leila Ben Youssef (United States), Bushido (rapper) (Germany),
Loco Dice (Germany), Sami Allagui (Germany), Änis Ben-Hatira (Germany), Mounir Chaftar (Germany),
Sofian Chahed (Germany), Nejmeddin Daghfous (Germany), Rani Khedira (Germany), Sami Khedira (Germany), Ayman (Germany),
Elyas M'Barek (Germany), Adel Tawil (Germany), Amel Karboul (Germany), Michel Boujenah (France),
Azzedine Alaïa (France), Tarak Ben Ammar (France), Lââm (France), Nolwenn Leroy (France), Yoann Touzghar (France), Isleym (France), 
Hatem Ben Arfa (France), Sadek (France), Tunisiano (France), Afef Jnifen (Italy), Sana Hassainia (Canada), Hinda Hicks (England), Mohamed Hechmi Hamdi (England), Hend Sabry (Egypt), Ghassan bin Jiddo (Lebanon), Cyril Hanouna (France), Kev Adams (France), Marwan Kenzari (The Netherlands), Mohamed Challouf (Italy)

Links with Tunisia 
In Tunisia, free courses of instruction in Tunisian Arabic are organised during the summer holidays for the children of Tunisian residents abroad, who are heavily influenced by the culture of the countries in which they live. Trips are also organised for them to experience Tunisian culture, history and civilisation.

See also 

 Arab Diaspora
 Tunisian Americans
 Tunisian Canadians
 Tunisians in France
 Tunisian people in Italy
 Arabs in Denmark
 Arabs in Sweden
 Arabs in Austria

References

Bibliography 
 Janice Alberti Russell, The Italian community in Tunisia. 1861-1961. A viable minority, éd. Université Columbia, Columbia, 1977
 Salah Rimani, Les Tunisiens de France : une forte concentration parisienne, éd. L'Harmattan, Paris, 1988
 Bruce Allen Watson, Exit Rommel. The Tunisian Campaign. 1942-43, coll. Stackpole Military History Series, éd. Stackpole Books, Mechanicsburg (Pennsylvanie), 1999,
 Maastricht university, An analysis of the Engagement of the Tunisian Diaspora in Germany and the Potentials for Cooperation, 2013

External links 
 Office des Tunisiens à l'étranger (Office of Tunisians Abroad)

 
Demographics of Tunisia